Jarwal Road railway station is a railway station on Lucknow–Gorakhpur line under the Lucknow NER railway division of North Eastern Railway zone. This is situated beside State Highway 13, at Kaiserganj Tehsil, Bambhaura in Bahraich district in the Indian state of Uttar Pradesh.

References

Railway stations in Bahraich district
Lucknow NER railway division